Joseph John Fox (August 2, 1855 – March 14, 1915) was an American prelate of the Roman Catholic Church who served as bishop of the Diocese of Green Bay in Wisconsin from 1904 until his death in 1914.

Biography

Early life
Joseph Fox was born in Green Bay, Wisconsin, to Paul and Frances (née Bartel) Fox, who were German immigrants.  He received his early education at the parochial school of the Cathedral of St. Francis Xavier in his native city. He made his classical studies at St. Francis Seminary in Milwaukee from 1870 to 1875. He then studied philosophy and theology at the American College of Louvain in Leuven, Belgium.

Priesthood 
While in Belgium, Fox was ordained to the priesthood for the Diocese of Green Bay on June 7, 1879.

Fox's first assignment, following his return to Wisconsin, was as pastor of St. Kilian Parish in New Franken, where he remained for eight months. He afterwards served at St. John the Baptist Parish in Green Bay for three years, in addition to serving as secretary to Bishop Francis Krautbauer. In 1883, Fox became pastor of Our Lady of Lourdes Parish in Marinette, Wisconsin, serving there for eleven years. He served as vicar general of the diocese from 1894 to 1904, and was named a domestic prelate by Pope Leo XIII in 1898.

Bishop of Green Bay
On May 27, 1904, Fox was appointed the fifth bishop of the Diocese of Green Bay by Pope Pius X. He received his episcopal consecration on June 25, 1904,  from Archbishop Sebastian Messmer, with Bishops William Stang and Frederick Eis serving as co-consecrators. He was the first and only native son of the diocese to become its bishop. During his tenure, Fox built a new episcopal residence, which later became the diocesan chancery (now demolished), and displayed a strong interest in education and advancing the parochial school system. Fox was a contributor to the Catholic Encyclopedia.

On November 7, 1914, Pope Benedict XV accepted Fox's resignation as bishop of Green Bay and appointed him as Titular Bishop of Ionopolis. Joseph Fox died in Chicago on March 14, 1915, at age 59.

See also

 Catholic Church hierarchy
 Catholic Church in the United States
 Historical list of the Catholic bishops of the United States
 List of Catholic bishops of the United States
 Lists of patriarchs, archbishops, and bishops

Notes

External links
Roman Catholic Diocese of Green Bay

1855 births
1915 deaths
20th-century Roman Catholic bishops in the United States
American College of the Immaculate Conception alumni
Catholic University of Leuven (1834–1968) alumni
Roman Catholic bishops of Green Bay
People from Marinette, Wisconsin
Contributors to the Catholic Encyclopedia